Henry Archdall Langley (15 October 1840 – 5 August 1906) was an influential Irish-born Anglican priest, of considerable physical strength, who migrated to Australia in 1853, and became the first Bishop of Bendigo from 1902 until his death in 1906.

Many of his 12 children made notable contributions to Australian society in the domains of business, education, medicine; also, two of them became Anglican bishops.

Family

He came to Australia in 1853 when his entire family emigrated from Ireland: the economic and social consequences of the Great Famine having greatly affected both boys' formal education at Trinity College, Dublin.

Parents
Born in Dungarvan on 15 October 1840, Henry Archdall Langley was the third son of Henry Langley (1802-1882) and Isabella Edwards Langley, née Archdall (1800-1874), of Ballyduff, Co. Waterford, Ireland.

Siblings
He had two brothers and three sisters:
 John Douse Langley (1836-1930) who became the second Bishop of Bendigo.
 Henry Archdall Langley who predeceased Langley's birth, dying of croup aged 16 months.
 Frances Elizabeth Uzzell (1842-1920), née Langley, who married William Frederick Boulton Uzzell (1834-1885), the incumbent of St Paul's Church, Carcoar, New South Wales, in October 1867. 
 Aphra Maria Isabella Glasson (1843-1925), née Hill, née Langley, who married Frederick Mellin Hill (-1870), JP in September 1864.Then, following Hill's death in 1870, and the death of their daughter, Catherine Isabella Hill, aged 6, in August 1871, Aphra married Richard Glasson (1837-1895) in July 1872.
 Catherine Isabella Pearse (1845-1927), née Langley, who married William Pearse (1841-1927) in March 1866.

Children
Langley had six sons and six daughters with his Australian-born wife, Elizabeth Mary Langley (1842-1923), née Strachan:
 Frederick Archdall Langley (1868-1952), a banker. 
 Isabella Charlotte Alice Carrington, née Langley (1869-1941).
 Aylmer John Langley (1872-1943), a banker.
 Hilda Sarah Langley (1874-1951), principal of St Catherine's School, Toorak.
 William Leslie Langley (1875-1952), Archdeacon of St Andrew's Cathedral, Sydney.
 Henry Thomas Langley (1877-1968), Dean of Melbourne.
 Minnie Ruth Langley (1878-1933), principal of St Catherine's School, Toorak.
 Aphra Victoria Pearce, née Langley (1879-1967).
 Nona Bertha Archdall-Pearce, née Langley (1881-1964).
 Francis Ernest Langley (1882-1946): a medical practitioner who also played Australian rules football for the Melbourne Football Club in the Victorian Football League (VFL) from 1900 to 1906.
 Doris Elizabeth Langley (1884-1958).<ref>[http://trove.nla.gov.au/newspaper/article/60620184 Births: Langley, The Australasian Sketcher, (Monday, 30 June 1884), p.110.]</ref>
 Arthur Theodore Langley (1886-1947), a medical practitioner.

Education
Langley was educated at Moore Theological College, Sydney, under Robert Lethbridge King (1868–1878), graduating in 1865.Religious Memoranda: Church of England, The Sydney Morning Herald, (Saturday, 23 June 1866), p.5.

Cleric
He was ordained deacon by Frederic Barker, Archbishop of Sydney, in 1865, and priest in 1866.

He was curate of All Saints' Church Bathurst from 1865 to 1867.  He later held incumbencies at Holy Trinity Church, Orange (1867-1869), St. Mary's Church Balmain (1870-1875), St Andrew's Cathedral, Sydney (1876), St. Matthew's Church Windsor (NSW) (1877-1878), and at the newly built St. Matthew's Church Prahran in 1878.

During his time at Prahran, he was responsible for founding St. Alban's Church, Armadale, as a "chapel of ease to that parish" in 1885; and, in 1935, the Golden Anniversary memorial service was conducted by Canon H.T. Langley, "son of the founder, who as a lad was the first to ring the bell of the church".St. Alban's Church, Armadale, The Argus, (Saturday, 5 November 1877), p.4.

He was Archdeacon of Gippsland from 1890 until 1894. In 1894 he became Archdeacon of Melbourne; a post he held until his ordination to the episcopate.

Bishop of Bendigo
In 1901, the Anglican ecclesiastical province of Victoria, already divided into the dioceses of Melbourne (established 1847) and Ballarat (established 1875), was further divided into three more sub-divisions — viz., that of Bendigo, Gippsland, and Wangaratta — and Langley was appointed as the first Bishop of Bendigo, serving for four and a half years from 5 March 1902 until his death on 5 August 1906.

Not only was Langley the very first Bishop of Bendigo, but he was also the very first graduate from Moore Theological College to be appointed as Bishop.

Bishopscourt, Bendigo
The "See House", situated at the corner of Napier Street and Lyons Street, White Hills, and designed by the Bendigo architects William Charles Vahland (1828–1915) and John Beebe (1866–1936), was expressly built for Langley. Generally known at the time as "Bishopscourt" — now known as "Langley Hall" — its Dedication Stone was laid in September 1904, and the Bishop and his family moved in during mid-March 1905.

Following the resignation of Langley's brother in 1919, the bishop's residence moved from White Hills to Forest Street, beside All Saints' Cathedral, and the former Bishopscourt building was leased to the Red Cross. A convalescent home for returned soldiers suffering shell shock and other "physical" injuries was opened in the building on 3 December 1919 by Lady Helen Munro Ferguson, the wife of the Governor General, and the President (and founder) of the Australian branch of the Red Cross. It continued to function as a convalescent home until 1926. For a time Langley Hall was used for the Bendigo Theological College, associated with the Australian College of Theology, under the direction of Rev. Frederick Alfred Philbey (1887-1947).

In 1932, Langley Hall was converted into St. Luke's Toddlers' Home, run by the Mission of St James and St John, which continued to operate until 1979, when it moved to a different location, and became St. Luke's Family Care''. The building, unused for a time, was completely refurbished, and has operated as bed and breakfast accommodation, as "Langley Hall", since 2000.

Death
The first Victorian Anglican bishop to die while still in office, he died of a cerebral haemorrhage, eleven days after collapsing at his residence.

A memorial plaque to Langley, was installed at St. Matthew's Church, Prahran; it was dedicated on 14 November 1907.

Successor
On his death in 1906 he was succeeded as Bishop of Bendigo by his older brother Rev. Dr. John Douse Langley.

Langley's brother had not been the first choice: the diocese's intended replacement, who had been unanimously elected to the vacant see (entirely without his knowledge or permission), was the (then) Bishop of Gippsland, Arthur Wellesley Pain (1841-1920). Pain refused to leave Gippsland, and continued to serve as Bishop of Gippsland until his retirement in 1917. Langley's brother was one of four candidates: the others were Dr. William Charles Sadlier (1867-1935), later Bishop of Nelson, Canon George M'Murray, formerly of Ballarat, of St. Mary's, Auckland, and William Tucker (1856-1934), later the Dean of Ballarat.

References

External links
 Langley Hall, Bendigo, Federation-House.

1840 births
20th-century Anglican bishops in Australia
Anglican bishops of Bendigo
Irish Anglicans
1906 deaths
People from County Waterford
People from Bendigo
Archdeacons of Melbourne